Voxelotor, sold under the brand name Oxbryta, is a medication used for the treatment of sickle cell disease. Voxelotor is the first hemoglobin oxygen-affinity modulator. Voxelotor has been shown to have disease-modifying potential by increasing hemoglobin levels and decreasing hemolysis indicators in sickle cell patients. It has a safe profile in sickle cell patients and healthy volunteers, without any dose-limiting toxicity. It was developed by Global Blood Therapeutics, a subsidiary of Pfizer. 

In November 2019, voxelotor received accelerated approval in the United States for the treatment of sickle cell disease for those twelve years of age and older. The U.S. Food and Drug Administration (FDA) considers it to be a first-in-class medication. In December 2021, voxelotor received accelerated approval in the United States for the treatment of sickle cell disease for those aged four to eleven years.

Side effects 
Common side effects include headache, diarrhea, abdominal pain, nausea, fatigue, rash and pyrexia (fever).

History 
Voxelotor was granted accelerated approval by the U.S. Food and Drug Administration (FDA) in November 2019. The FDA granted the application for voxelotor fast track designation and orphan drug designation.

The approval of voxelotor was based on the results of a clinical trial with 274 participants with sickle cell disease. The FDA granted the approval of Oxbryta to Global Blood Therapeutics.

Society and culture

Legal status 
On 16 December 2021, the Committee for Medicinal Products for Human Use (CHMP)  of the European Medicines Agency (EMA) adopted a positive opinion, recommending the granting of a marketing authorization for the medicinal product Oxbryta, intended for the treatment of hemolytic anemia due to sickle cell disease. The applicant for this medicinal product is Global Blood Therapeutics Netherlands B.V. Voxelotor (Oxbryta) was approved for medical use in the European Union in February 2022.

References

External links 
 

Breakthrough therapy
Orphan drugs
Pfizer brands
Sickle-cell disease